(born 29 March 1948) is a Professor Emeritus at Nagoya University and The University of Tokyo. He is a Fellow of the Toyota Physical and Chemical Research Institute. In 1978 and 1979 he wrote a series of papers with Sir Sam Edwards expanding on the concept of reptation introduced by Pierre-Gilles de Gennes in 1971.  In 1996 he authored the textbook Introduction to Polymer Physics.

In 2001 the American Physical Society awarded Doi the Polymer Physics Prize for "pioneering contributions to the theory of dynamics and rheology of entangled polymers and complex
fluids."

He was also awarded the Bingham Medal in 2001 by the Society of Rheology.

In 2016, he was elected a member of the National Academy of Engineering for contributions to the rheology of polymeric liquids, especially the entanglement effect in concentrated solutions and melts.

References

Living people
Academic staff of Nagoya University
University of Tokyo alumni
Academic staff of the University of Tokyo
Japanese scientists
Polymer scientists and engineers
1948 births